The 1995–96 Vyshcha Liha season was the 5th since its establishment. FC Dynamo Kyiv were the defending champions.

Teams

Promotions
Zirka-NIBAS Kirovohrad, the champion of the 1994–95 Ukrainian First League  – (debut)
CSKA-Borysfen Kyiv, the runner-up of the 1994–95 Ukrainian First League  – (debut)

Renamed
 Before the start of the season Zorya-MALS Luhansk changed its name to Zorya Luhansk.

Location

Managers

Changes

League table

Results

Top goalscorers

External links
ukrsoccerhistory.com - source of information

Ukrainian Premier League seasons
1995–96 in Ukrainian association football leagues
Ukra